Mark Stephen Fox (born 17 November 1975) is an English former professional footballer who played as a midfielder in the Football League for Brighton & Hove Albion.

Life and career
Fox was born in 1975 in Basingstoke, Hampshire, where he attended Brighton Hill School. He played football for Fleet Town before signing for Brighton & Hove Albion in 1994. He made 36 appearances over three seasons with the club, before returning to non-league football with clubs including Bashley, Basingstoke Town, and St Leonards.

Fox's younger brother Simon played alongside him for Brighton & Hove Albion.

References

1975 births
Living people
Sportspeople from Basingstoke
English footballers
Association football midfielders
Fleet Town F.C. players
Brighton & Hove Albion F.C. players
Bashley F.C. players
Basingstoke Town F.C. players
St. Leonards F.C. players
English Football League players
Southern Football League players
Footballers from Hampshire